Gail Harris (born 16 December 1964) is a British-born model, actress, adult-magazine publisher and adult-industry entrepreneur.

Life and career

Modelling
Before her film-industry work, Gail Thackray was a Page 3 girl (glamour model) for the British tabloid press. She then became a popular nude model from the mid–1980s, frequenting the pages of various pornographic magazines, including Knave, Penthouse, Mayfair, High Society, and Genesis. In 1986, as Gail Thackray, she was featured on the front cover, centerfold, and 14-page spread of Larry Flynt's Hustler and the 10th-anniversary feature model of High Society.

Hollywood
She then started her career in Hollywood as an extra and actress performing nude scenes in low-budget B-movies, sexploitation films, and softcore porn film and video. In the mid‑1980s, she appeared nude in many episodes of Electric Blue, an erotic show that aired mainly on the Playboy Channel. She costarred with many porn stars including Kitten Natividad, Candie Evans, Taylor St. Clair, Ron Jeremy, and Ginger Lynn Allen. She also began performing stunt and body double work. 

In 1990, Harris starred in two horror/action direct-to-video films for director Jim Wynorski In Hard to Die, credited as Robyn Harris, she stars as a lingerie model who is trapped in a high rise with a madman and gets to fire a machine gun in skimpy underwear. In Sorority House Massacre II, Harris plays the female lead as a co-ed terrorized by a serial killer. Harris is popularly known as a "scream queen" and was named in the website Mr. Skin's Nudity Hall of Fame.

Falcon Foto 
In 1988, Harris founded Falcon Foto, a prominent provider of adult-entertainment material to the publishing and Internet industries with a library of over 2 million images. A 2004 USA Today story stated that Falcon Foto had the world's largest privately owned library of erotic photos, worth more than $25 million according to online experts. Falcon Foto also serves as the major licensor of adult material to print publishing groups, contributing approximately 40% of all photo content in the industry.

Barely Legal 
In 1988, Harris created the first niche adult magazine, Barely Legal, for Larry Flynt Publications, which became one of Flynt's best-selling titles. The launch of Barely Legal revolutionized the industry with 22 copycat titles appearing, as well as format changes in established publications and in the video medium. With a second title, Hometown Girls, published, in partnership with Flynt, Falcom becoming Flynt's third top earner. Falcon Foto's third announcement of a new title Virgins Magazine created a bidding war before the concept was even released.

Internet porn and niche markets 
When the Internet began to rapidly expand in the mid 1990s, Harris already had a viable pornographic business in place. Falcon Foto began digitizing their entire library for use on the Internet and by the early 2000s, Harris had created multiple Internet sites, such as FalconFoto.com, FalconFoto.net, and Falcongold.com, focusing on the pornographic 'niche' market. In a 2003 interview, she stated the mission of her company was "[t]o provide the best adult content to satisfy the niche fantasy of every perv on the Internet." She also claimed her company had the distinction of being the "first to shoot a granny and the first to create an entire magazine devoted to young girls." Her other niche products included photos and videos for Barely Legal, Busty Beauties, Hometown Girls, 40+, Plumpers, and other magazines.

In 2003, Harris collaborated with Larry Flynt III to create Contrentrus.com, both producing and marketing pornographic video products.

In 2006, Harris finished a year as a consultant for Flynt, putting her staff to work helping Flynt develop websites, Vegas casino projects, video lines, and a mobile operation within his empire.

In 2006, Harris collaborated with porn actors Brandi Love and Chris Potoski to form Naked Rhino Media, a multimedia porn site that featured exclusive niche-specific content.

Personal life
Harris met her first husband Scott Harris while skydiving in the United States. Scott was the photographer who parachuted into the Michael Jackson compound during the 6 October 1991 wedding for Elizabeth Taylor and Larry Fortensky.

On 1 August 2004, Thackray married adult entertainment entrepreneur Jason Tucker. On 19 February 2011, they were legally separated.

Thackray retired from acting and producing in 2002 and stayed on as a resident of Los Angeles in the United States.

Partial filmography
 Takin' It Off (1985) (video) as Hannah
 Electric Blue 38 (1986) (video) as Limo Driver
 Electric Blue 41 (1986) (video) as Jeanie
 Electric Blue 43 (1986) (video) as Louise
 Party Favors (1987) as Nicole
 Electric Blue 47 (1987) (video) as Little Jo
 Electric Blue 48 (1987) (video) as John Squib's Girl
 For Love and Money (1987) as Fawny Van Renzlia
 Electric Blue 49 (1987) (video) as Girl on Video Monitor
 Electric Blue 50 (1987) (video) as Swimwear Model
 Savage Harbor (1987) as Harry's Girlfriend
 Takin' It All Off (1987) as Hannah McCall
 Screwball Hotel (1988) (uncredited)
 Hard to Die (1990) (as Robyn Harris) as Dawn Grant
 Sorority House Massacre II (1990) (as Robyn Harris) as Linda
 The Haunting of Morella (1990) as Ilsa
 Rainbow Drive (1990) (TV) as Club Girl
 Forbidden Games (1995) as Tonya Douglas
 Masseuse (1996) (as Robyn Harris) as Diane
 Dream On as Catering Girl (1 episode, 1996)
 Alien Escape (1997) as Cindy
 Masseuse 3 (1998/I) (video) as Debbie
 The Outsider (1998) (TV) as Wubba Wubba Girl
 The Circuit (2002) as Nicole Kent
 The Circuit 2: The Final Punch (2002) (video) as Nicole Kent
 Treasure Hunt (2003) (video) as Gail
 Quigley (2003) as Woman on Street
 Curse of the Komodo (2004) as Dr. Dawn Porter

References

External links
 
 
Running With Wolves Book

1964 births
Living people
English film actresses
People from Batley
Actresses from Yorkshire
Actors from Batley
Page 3 girls